The More It Goes, the Less It Goes is a 1977 French film..

Plot
Two police inspectors are investigating a homicide.

Cast
 Jean-Pierre Marielle as Inspector Pignon
 Jean Carmet as Inspector Melville
 Niels Arestrup as Vincent
 Caroline Cartier as Sylvia Rastadelle
 Henri Garcin as Edouard Jesufard
 Louis Jourdan as Paul Tango
 Mort Shuman as Francis Million
 Helga Liné as Annie
 Nadiuska as Zuka
 Tomás Picó as Alex
 Mostéfa Stiti as Salah
 Máximo Valverde as Donald Passover

References

External links

Plus ca va moins ca va at TCMDB

1977 films
French crime drama films
1970s French-language films
1970s French films